Clayton Crain is an American comic book artist known for his digital painted work on Marvel Comics books such as Ghost Rider, X-Force, and Carnage, and also on the Valiant Comics series Rai. Crain is also known for his work with Todd McFarlane, covers for DC, and his unique sketch cover acrylic paintings.

Early life 
Clayton Crain grew up in Moxee, Washington with his parents and older sister. He was sketching on his schoolwork from a very early age and made the definitive choice to be a comic book illustrator at the age of 14 after seeing The Amazing Spider-Man #315.

Career 
Crain's career began with Acclaim Comics after he showed editor Fabian Nicieza a 5-page original story board of his artwork. His first book was Shadowman issues 16–20. Crain went on to work on various projects for Todd McFarlane, Top Cow Productions, Marvel Comics, and DC Comics.

Crain is working for Valiant Comics on the book Rai, with writer Matt Kindt.

Bibliography

Self-published 
Impure #1-?
342 #1-?

Acclaim 
Shadowman #16-20 (1998), his first professional work (as Klayton Krain)

Image 
Curse of the Spawn #24-29 (1998–99)
Kiss Psycho Circus #18-31 (1999–2000)
Darkness, vol. 1, #34-36
Sam & Twitch #14
No Honor #1-4
Universe #1-8
Tom Judge: End Of Days #1
"Savior" 1-8 (2015)

 Marvel Amazing Spider-Man #538 (variant cover, 2007)Ant-Man #1-4 (unpublished)Carnage #1-5 (2010–2011)Carnage: U.S.A. #1-5 (2012)Four #29 (cover, 2006)Ghost Rider: Road to Damnation miniseries, #1-6 (2005–06)Ghost Rider: Trail of Tears miniseries, #1-6 (2007)Wolverine/Punisher miniseries, #4 (Marvel Knights (cover, 2004)Sensational Spider-man vol. 2 (interiors): #26, 28, 39-40; (covers): #27, #30-33 (2006-07)Silver Surfer, vol. 3, #10 (cover, 2004)Spider-Geddon, Limited Series, #0 (interiors, cover) (2018)Toxin, miniseries, #2 (cover, 2005)Thunderbolts #114 (variant cover, 2007)Ultimate Comics Fallout #4 (2011)Venom #14 (cover, 2004)Venom/Carnage, miniseries, #1-4 (2004)X-Force vol. 3 #1-6, 11-16, 21-25 (2009–2010)

 Collections 
Trade paperback collections include:Ghost Rider:Road to Damnation (Marvel, 6-issue mini-series, 2005, July 2006 )Trail of Tears'' (Marvel, 6-issue mini-series, 2007, September 2007)

References

External links 

American comics artists
Living people
20th-century American painters
American male painters
21st-century American painters
Artists from Oregon
Place of birth missing (living people)
Year of birth missing (living people)
20th-century American male artists